Britches may refer to:

Breeches, or britches, an item of clothing
Britches (monkey), a baby monkey removed from a laboratory by the Animal Liberation Front.